The Shakespeare Birthplace Trust (SBT) is an independent registered educational charity based in Stratford-upon-Avon, Warwickshire, England, that came into existence in 1847 following the purchase of William Shakespeare's birthplace for preservation as a national memorial. It can also lay claim to be the oldest conservation society in Britain. Receiving no government funding or public subsidies, it is totally dependent upon the public for support, and relies on donations and the income generated from visitors.

The SBT is considered the most significant Shakespeare charity in the world, and endeavours to internationally promote the appreciation and study of the plays and other works of William Shakespeare, and general advancements of Shakespearean knowledge. The Trust maintains and preserves the Shakespeare Birthplace properties, a museum, library of books, manuscripts, records of historic interest, pictures, photographs and objects of antiquity with particular reference to the life and times of William Shakespeare, and is also home to the headquarters of the International Shakespeare Association.

Origins of the Trust
For more than 200 years after his death, Shakespeare's birthplace was occupied by the descendants of his recently widowed sister, Joan Hart. Under the terms of Shakespeare's will, the ownership of the whole property (the inn and Joan Hart's cottage) passed to his elder daughter, Susanna; and then on her death in 1649, to her only child, Elizabeth. Elizabeth died in 1670, bequeathing it to Thomas Hart, the descendant of Shakespeare's sister, Joan, whose family had continued as tenants of the cottage after her death in 1646. The Harts remained owners of the whole property until 1806, when it was sold to a butcher, Thomas Court. When it was again put up for sale in 1846 on the death of Court's widow, the American showman P. T. Barnum proposed to buy the home and ship it "brick-by-brick" to the US. To purchase the property for the nation, the Shakespeare Birthday Committee was formed, and donors including Charles Dickens helped the committee raise £3,000 and bought it the following year. Incorporated by a private Act of Parliament, the Birthday Committee became the Shakespeare Birthplace Trust.

Properties

The headquarters of the Shakespeare Birthplace Trust is the Shakespeare Centre, a glass and concrete structure next to the Birthplace. The driving force behind its construction and opening in 1964 was Dr Levi Fox, OBE, Director of the Trust from 1945 to 1989, with a view to properly housing its library, documents and collections which attract scholars from all over the world.

The Trust currently owns and cares for a number of houses relating to Shakespeare in and around the town of Stratford-upon-Avon as well as for Harvard House:

Shakespeare's Birthplace
William Shakespeare's birthplace and childhood home. The building currently recreates a picture of family life at the time of Shakespeare complete with period domestic furnishings, as well as John Shakespeare's glove making workshop ready for work. Other exhibitions illustrate the changing occupancy and functions of the Birthplace (from Shakespeare's time onwards): as a home, workshop, inn, butcher's shop, literary shrine and visitor attraction.

Hall's Croft
Hall's Croft is believed to be the house of Shakespeare's daughter Susanna and her husband, Dr. John Hall, c. 1613–1616. It now contains a collection of 16th and 17th century paintings and furniture, as well as an exhibition about Dr. Hall and the obscure medical practices of the period. The SBT are currently carrying out major conservation work on the house. The house is open to the public.

Anne Hathaway's Cottage
Located about a mile west of Stratford.  Although called a cottage, the childhood home of Shakespeare's wife Anne is, in fact, a spacious twelve-roomed farmhouse with several bedrooms. In Shakespeare's day it was known as Newlands Farm, and remained in the Hathaway family for many generations. It was acquired by the Trust in 1892, and is open to public visitors as a museum.

Shakespeare's New Place
Created on the site of Shakespeare's family home in Stratford, Shakespeare’s New Place provides an imaginative contemporary perspective on Shakespeare when he was in his prime. It showcases artworks, contemporary landscaped and traditional gardens, as well as a major exhibition displayed in the restored and extended Grade I Listed Tudor Nash’s House next door.

Palmer's Farm
Situated in the hamlet of Wilmcote, the 16th century farmhouse known as Palmer's Farm was thought to be the childhood home of Shakespeare's mother, Mary Arden, and was purchased by the Trust in 1930. It was called Mary Arden's House until 2000 when it was discovered that in the 1570s and '80s it belonged to a friend and neighbour Adam Palmer instead, and the house was consequently renamed Palmer's Farm. Palmer's Farm together with Glebe Farm form the Shakespeare Countryside Museum.

Glebe Farm
To the west of neighbouring Palmer's Farm and part of the Shakespeare Countryside Museum lies Glebe Farm, which dates from 1514 and was acquired by the Trust in 1968 when it was threatened by developers. In 2000 it was discovered that it had belonged to the Arden family and was in fact the true childhood home of Shakespeare's mother, Mary Arden, and the name Mary Arden's House was transferred to it.

Harvard House
Situated in High Street, Stratford-upon-Avon; Harvard House was built by Thomas Rogers, grandfather of the benefactor of Harvard University, John Harvard, and home of Harvard's mother. Since 1995 it has housed the Museum of British Pewter.

Library and archive
The Library and Records Office, now amalgamated to form the Shakespeare Centre Library and Archive, house the Shakespeare and Local Collections:

The Shakespeare Collections:
consists of the combined printed book collections of the Shakespeare Birthplace Trust and the Royal Shakespeare Company (RSC), as well as the archive of the Shakespeare Memorial Theatre 1879–1960 and of the RSC from 1961 onwards. The Trust maintains one of the world's most important Shakespeare libraries, the collections of which include translations of Shakespeare in over 70 languages, and many unique documents relating to Shakespeare and his family, second only in number to those in The National Archives in London.
The Local Collections:
includes many thousands of archival records, books, photographs and maps relating to Stratford-upon-Avon and the surrounding area, as well as historical documents concerning Shakespeare and his family.

Museums department
The Museums Department is responsible for the care and display of all the historic museum items that the trust owns, principally items that relate to Shakespeare's life and times, which encompass a wide range of material. Other collections include items that represent the social and economic life of Stratford-upon-Avon, and a special collection of pewter, dating from Roman times until the present day. The Trust's Collections and Conservation Department is based in the Shakespeare Centre in Stratford-upon-Avon.

The Trust owns various extensive collections:

Archaeology
Roman and Anglo-Saxon artefacts from local sites including jewellery, weapons and ceramics. Also local fossils and prehistoric items.

Art
Works of art relating to Shakespeare and to the history of Stratford-upon-Avon.

Furniture and Furnishings
Domestic items dating from the 15th to the 19th century, particularly furniture dating from the 16th and 17th centuries.

Numismatics
Coins and tokens found in Stratford and relating to Shakespeare. The collection also covers a period extending back to pre-Roman Celtic Britain.

Pewter
The first Museum of British pewter based at Harvard House includes items ranging from Roman times to the 1930s, but has a strong core of 16th- and 17th-century pewter.

Shakespeariana
Items linked to William Shakespeare himself, such as the purported Shakespeare's signet ring.

Social History
A wide range of objects illustrate the civic, social and working life of Stratford-upon-Avon through the ages.

Textiles
Examples of Elizabethan embroidery and 17th-century painted cloths.

Education and activities
The Trust hosts a variety of events and provides talks, lectures and courses related to Shakespeare for the general public, and for students at all levels ranging from primary school pupils (with the Heritage Education team) to university students. Through its education department, the Trust also runs international programmes throughout the year on Shakespeare's writings.

The SBT runs the Stratford-upon-Avon Poetry Festival, the oldest in the UK. The SBT introduced the new Shakespeare Film Festival to its events calendar in 2012, the first festival of its kind in the UK.

At Mary Arden's Farm the SBT rears prize-winning livestock including Cotswold sheep and Longhorn cattle.

The Trust begun holding an artist in resident from 2015, the first being held by Roger Hartley who runs the Bureau of Silly Ideas. Others to hold the position include Thor McIntyre and Carrie Reichardt.

References

Further reading

External links
 
 
 Shakespeare Birthplace Trust Acts 1891 and 1961 on the UK Parliament website

 
1847 establishments in England